Weekend in Monaco is the sixth album by the American jazz group the Rippingtons, released in 1992. The album reached No. 2 on Billboard's Contemporary Jazz chart. It has sold more than 300,000 copies.

Critical reception
The Washington Post wrote: "Guitarist Russ Freeman, who now gets top billing in the band, deserves some credit for trying to reflect the band's world travels in its music, but the results are often so tame and homogenized that one has to ask the question, why bother?" The Globe and Mail stated that "Freeman's formula for assertively tuneful fusion—modestly dramatic, light on raunch—works well enough again on Weekend in Monaco to sustain Rippingtons' high ranking among the idiom's second-generation, West-Coast bands."

Track listing
All tracks composed by Russ Freeman
"Weekend in Monaco" - 5:19
"St. Tropez" - 5:55
"Vienna" - 4:49
"Indian Summer" - 5:44
"A Place for Lovers" - 5:12
"Carnival" - 5:45
"Moka Java" - 5:46
"Highroller" - 5:56
"Where the Road Will Lead Us" - 4:15

Personnel
 Russ Freeman – keyboards, acoustic guitar, electric guitar, classical guitar, bass guitar 
 Mark Portmann – acoustic piano solos  (1, 2, 3, 7)
 Kim Stone – bass guitar (1, 2, 4, 7, 8), bass solo (8)
 Steve Bailey – fretless bass (3, 5, 6, 9)
 Tony Morales – drums
 Steve Reid – percussion, congas, toy, Brazilian percussion (6), soundscapes (6), timbales (7)
 Jeff Kashiwa – alto saxophone (1, 4, 8), tenor saxophone (2), EWI controller (4, 6), soprano saxophone (5, 9), alto sax solo (7), soundscapes (9)

Production
 Russ Freeman – producer, recording, mixing 
 Dave Grusin – executive producer 
 Larry Rosen – executive producer 
 Carl Griffin – assistant executive producer 
 Suzy Freeman – additional engineer (1)
 Brian Springer – additional engineer (1)
 Steve Reid – soundscape recording (6)
 Brant Biles – mixing (2-9)
 Robert Margouleff – mixing (2-9)
 Joseph Doughney – post-production editing
 Michael Landy – post-production editing
 Adam Zelinka – post-production editing
 Bernie Grundman – mastering 
 Andi Howard – production coordinator, management 
 Michael Pollard – production coordinator
 Doreen Kalcich – production assistant 
 Andy Baltimore – creative director 
 David Gibb – graphic design 
 Scott Johnson – graphic design
 Sonny Mediana – graphic design
 Andy Ruggirello – graphic design
 Dan Serrano – graphic design
 Emil Bogan – graphic design assistant 
 Bill Mayer – front cover artwork

Studios
 Recorded and Mixed at Cheyenne Mountain Ranch Studios (Colorado).
 Soundscape recording at The Slamm Stack (North Hollywood, California).
 Mastered at Bernie Grundman Mastering (Hollywood, California).

Charts

References

External links
The Rippingtons-Weekend In Monaco at Discogs
The Rippingtons-Weekend in Monaco at AllMusic
The Rippingtons Official Website

The Rippingtons albums
1992 albums
GRP Records albums